On Circles is the fifth studio album by American band Caspian. It was released on January 24, 2020 through Triple Crown Records.

The first single from the album "Flowers of Light" was released on November 14, 2019.

Critical reception
On Circles was met with generally favorable reviews from critics. At Metacritic, which assigns a weighted average rating out of 100 to reviews from mainstream publications, this release received an average score of 71, based on 4 reviews.

Track listing

References

2020 albums
Caspian (band) albums
Triple Crown Records albums